Piotr Myszka (born 25 July 1981) is a Polish windsurfer. He won the gold medal at the 2010 RS:X Windsurfing World Championships and at the 2016 RS:X Windsurfing World Championships.

References

1981 births
Living people
Polish windsurfers
People from Mrągowo
Sailors at the 2016 Summer Olympics – RS:X
Olympic sailors of Poland
Universiade medalists in sailing
Universiade silver medalists for Poland
Medalists at the 2005 Summer Universiade
Sailors at the 2020 Summer Olympics – RS:X
RS:X class world champions